Al-Zubair District is a district in Basra Governorate, Iraq. It seat is the city of Al-Zubair. In the 1880s some Najd tribes immigrated to al-Zubair due to the fact that Najd had nothing to offer, but around 1945s they returned to their home (Saudi Arabia) after it has changed notably. In the early 1990s, Saddam Hussein hoped to make al-Zubair province number 19 and annex it to Kuwait after invading. The failure of the Invasion of Kuwait put rest to this idea. The district is majority Sunni of Maliki .

Districts of Basra Province